Ashaq Qaleh (also Romanized as Āshāq Qal‘eh, Ashāq Qal‘eh, Ashshāq Qal‘eh, and Esḩāq Qal‘eh; also known as Āshāqī Qal‘eh, Es-hagh Ghal”eh, Eshāqī Qal‘eh, and Is-hāq Qal‘eh) is a village in Tork-e Gharbi Rural District, Jowkar District, Malayer County, Hamadan Province, Iran. At the 2006 census, its population was 248, in 53 families.

References 

Populated places in Malayer County